Yannick Mayer (born 15 February 1991 in Mosbach) is a German cyclist, who currently competes for German amateur teams Veloclub Ratisbona Regensburg in road cycling and Team Beacon in cyclo-cross.

Major results

2011 
 1st Stage 2 Ronde de l'Isard
2013
 2nd Tour de Delta
2015
 1st Stage 4 Vuelta a la Independencia Nacional
2019
 7th Visegrad 4 Bicycle Race – GP Polski

References

External links

1991 births
Living people
German male cyclists
Cyclo-cross cyclists
People from Neckar-Odenwald-Kreis
Sportspeople from Karlsruhe (region)
Cyclists from Baden-Württemberg